Hasanali Kandi (also Romanized as Ḩasan‘alī Kandī) is a village in Sardabeh Rural District, in the Central District of Ardabil County, Ardabil Province, Iran. At the 2006 census, its population was 213, in 39 families.

References 

Towns and villages in Ardabil County